The Old House of Siiao Family is a former residence in Jiadong Township, Pingtung County, Taiwan.

History
The Siiao family came to Taiwan from Guangdong and worked as businessmen. They then decided to construct a house for their residential place. The construction of the house began in 1860 and completed in 1880. After the handover of Taiwan to Japan from Qing Dynasty in 1895, there was local conflict between the locals and Japanese government which stirred up some shooting. Some of the bullet holes remains are still visible on the room walls. The house was then later registered as Class 3 historical site.

Architecture
The house was constructed with two courtyards and five blocks with Hakka architecture style. The five blocks are the entrance hall, ancestor's memorial tablets room and Gods of heaven and ground shrine room and dwelling places. It has a total floor area of 4,000 m2 and consists of more than 50 rooms.

See also
 List of tourist attractions in Taiwan

References

1880 establishments in Taiwan
Buildings and structures in Pingtung County
Houses completed in 1880
Houses in Taiwan